The Foundation is a Canadian television sitcom, airing on Showcase in the 2009-10 television season.

Created and produced by Michael Dowse, the show stars Mike Wilmot as Michael Valmont-Selkirk, the crooked and corrupt director of a philanthropic foundation. The cast also includes Martin Sims, Rebecca Northan, Yvan Ponton, Paul Spence, Michael Sinelnikoff and Martha Burns.

References

External links

2009 Canadian television series debuts
2009 Canadian television series endings
Showcase (Canadian TV channel) original programming
2000s Canadian sitcoms
2000s Canadian workplace comedy television series